Effingham station is an Amtrak intercity train station in Effingham, Illinois, United States. The station contains three houses, at the CSXT St. Louis Line Subdivision (ex-Pennsylvania Railroad) crossing that once served Amtrak's former National Limited line between Kansas City and either Washington D.C. or New York City until 1979. The station is a flag stop on the City of New Orleans route, served only when passengers have tickets to and from the station; the  also stops here.

References

External links 

Effingham Amtrak Station (USA Rail Guide -- Train Web)

Amtrak stations in Illinois
Former Illinois Central Railroad stations
Former Pennsylvania Railroad stations
Buildings and structures in Effingham County, Illinois